Fairfield Farms is a historic estate house located near Berryville, Clarke County, Virginia.  It was built in 1768, and designed by architect John Ariss and built for Warner Washington, first cousin to George Washington.  During his surveying for Lord Fairfax, George Washington helped survey and layout the property for John Aris.  It is a five-part complex with a -story hipped-roof central block having walls of irregular native limestone ashlar throughout.  It is in the Georgian style.  Located on the property are a contributing large brick, frame and stone barn and an overseer's house.

In February 2018, Fairfield Farms was purchased by developer Charles Paret, a Virginia native, who was unsuccessful in his endeavor to develop the property.  

Fairfield was listed on the National Register of Historic Places in 1970.

References

National Register of Historic Places in Clarke County, Virginia
Georgian architecture in Virginia
Houses in Clarke County, Virginia
John Ariss buildings
Colonial architecture in Virginia
Washington family residences
Houses on the National Register of Historic Places in Virginia
1770 establishments in Virginia